4 Persei is a single star in the northern constellation of Perseus, located around 670 light years away from the Sun. It is visible to the naked eye as a faint, blue-white hued star with an apparent visual magnitude of 5.04 The Bayer designation for this star is g Persei; 4 Persei is the Flamsteed designation. This object has a peculiar velocity of 26.3 km/s and may be a runaway star.

The stellar classification for 4 Persei is B8 III, matching an aging B-type giant star that has evolved off the main sequence. It is spinning with a projected rotational velocity of 60 km/s and has about 3.2 times the Sun's radius The star is radiating 670 times the luminosity of the Sun from its photosphere at an effective temperature of 12,230 K. 4 Persei is embedded in a small, relatively dense dust cloud, which is resulting in infrared emission from the cold dust.

References

B-type giants
Runaway stars
Perseus (constellation)
Persei, g
BD+53 439
Persei, 04
012303
009505
0590